"Burn, Witch. Burn!" is the fifth episode of the third season of the anthology television series American Horror Story, which premiered on November 6, 2013, on the cable network FX.

This episode focuses on Fiona (Jessica Lange) exacting revenge on Myrtle Snow (Frances Conroy) after Cordelia (Sarah Paulson) is blinded.

Plot

At the academy, the students fend off an attack by Madame LaLaurie's daughters, Marie Laveau, and their zombies.

At the bar, Fiona hears Cordelia scream from the attack, and calls for an ambulance. In the hospital, after Dr. Wilson tells Fiona that they couldn't save Cordelia's eyesight, Fiona raids the pharmacy for pills. Fiona stumbles into a room where a woman has just given birth to a stillborn baby. Fiona brings the dead infant to the woman and, as Fiona brushes her hand over the baby, it starts to breathe. When Hank makes it to the hospital, Fiona leaves to give him 15 minutes with Cordelia before she throws him out. He takes Cordelia's hand, and she has vision of him having sex with Kaylee.

The Council returns and orders that Fiona abdicate her Supremacy. Fiona refuses and accuses Myrtle of the acid attack on Cordelia. Cecily and Quentin vote to "burn the witch". The Coven and the Council walk out to a quarry where Myrtle is roped to a stake and doused in gasoline. Fiona flicks her lit cigarette at Myrtle and her body goes up in flames, killing her. Back at the house, it is revealed Queenie dipped her hand in a glass of acid at a key moment during Fiona's interrogation, framing Myrtle. Fiona flatters Queenie, telling her she can help build her powers, maybe even to become the next Supreme.

At the quarry, Misty Day finds Myrtle's charred corpse and uses her powers of resurgence to bring her back to life.

Reception
"Burn, Witch. Burn!" received a 2.2 18–49 ratings share and was watched by 3.80 million viewers, winning the night for cable.

Rotten Tomatoes reports a 94% approval rating, based on 16 reviews. The critical consensus reads, "Philosophical exploration of maternal challenges and a challenging, extraordinary turn for Kathy Bates make "Burn, Witch. Burn!" an excellent – albeit weird – hour of television." Emily VanDerWerff of The A.V. Club gave the episode a B+ rating, saying, "The episodes have all been packed with incident, with crazy moments and crazy twists, but there's not yet a center, and without a center, things cannot, well... you know." Matt Fowler from IGN gave the episode an 8.4/10 rating, calling it a great episode, saying, "This week's episode of Coven gave us a half great/half confusing zombie attack and some emotional moments involving mothers feeling shame and regret."

The episode was chosen as one of The Atlantic Best TV Episodes of 2013.

References

External links

 

2013 American television episodes
American Horror Story: Coven episodes
Fiction set in 1833
Halloween television episodes
Television episodes about zombies
Television episodes directed by Jeremy Podeswa